The Charlotte (pronounced shar-lot) spiral, also known as the candle stick, is a figure skating spiral. The skater bends forward and glides on one leg with the other one lifted into the air. The skater's torso is upright, but during the Charlotte, the skater's torso is as close to the grounded foot as possible. When performed well, the skater's legs are almost in a straight vertical split position. The Charlotte requires great flexibility and balance. 

A Charlotte can be performed either forward or backward. It is usually performed backwards, although some skaters have performed it forwards in competition.

The Charlotte is named for German skater Charlotte Oelschlägel, who first performed the move in the early 1900s. Michelle Kwan and Sasha Cohen are generally credited as bringing the move back into popularity during the late 1990s and early 2000s.

The position is rarely performed by men, notable exceptions being John Curry, Rohene Ward, Michael Christian Martinez and a few others.

References
 Figure skating glossary

Figure skating elements